Jorge Delgado Caballero (born 9 November 2002) is a Spanish footballer who plays as a forward for Rayo Cantabria.

Club career
Born in Móstoles, Community of Madrid, Delgado joined Getafe CF's youth setup in 2018, from hometown side CD Móstoles URJC. He made his senior debut with the reserves on 21 March 2021, starting in a 3–1 Segunda División B away loss against CD Atlético Baleares, and scored his first goal fourteen days later by netting the B's first in a 2–2 home draw against UD Melilla.

On 31 July 2021, Delgado was announced as an addition of Racing de Santander's reserve team in Segunda División RFEF, but the move never materialized and he returned to Getafe B instead. The following 10 January, however, he moved to Racing's B-side on loan until the end of the season.

On 9 August 2022, Delgado signed a permanent three-year contract with the Verdiblancos, and was again assigned to the B-team. He made his debut with the main squad on 15 October, coming on as a late substitute for Jorge Pombo in a 0–0 away draw against SD Huesca in the Segunda División.

References

External links

2002 births
Living people
People from Móstoles
Spanish footballers
Footballers from the Community of Madrid
Association football forwards
Segunda División players
Segunda División B players
Segunda Federación players
Tercera Federación players
Getafe CF B players
Rayo Cantabria players
Racing de Santander players